Sir Edward Duke, 1st Baronet (c. 1604 – 1671)  was an English politician who sat in the House of Commons of England  in 1640.

Duke was the son of Ambrose Duke of Benhall and his wife Elizabeth Calthrop, daughter of Bartholemew Calthrop of Suffolk. His father died in 1610 and he inherited the estates of  Benhall, Suffolk. He was High Sheriff of Suffolk in 1638 when he also built a new mansion at Benhall.

In April 1640, Duke was elected Member of Parliament for Orford. He was knighted and made a commissioner of array. In 1661, Duke was created a baronet of Benhall and Brampton, Cambridgeshire by King Charles II of England.
 
Duke married Ellenor Panton, daughter of John Panton of Westminster  and of Brunslip, Denbighshire, and had 29 children by her. His son John succeeded to the baronetcy and was also MP for Orford. His daughter Elizabeth married Nathaniel Bacon and as he had forbidden the match, she was cut off without a penny. However, both Thomas Bacon, Nathaniel's wealthy merchant father, and Elizabeth's brother John made ample provision for the young couple.

References

1600s births
1671 deaths
English MPs 1640 (April)
High Sheriffs of Suffolk
Knights Bachelor
Baronets in the Baronetage of England